Major Grahame Wilson, GCV, SCR, BCR, also known as "The Phantom Major", is a retired Rhodesian Army officer who served as second-in-command of the Rhodesian Special Air Service (SAS). He is the most decorated member of the Rhodesian Army.

Military career
Wilson served with the Rhodesian African Rifles (RAR) before passing selection for the Rhodesian Special Air Service (SAS) in 1975. He later rose to second-in-command of the regiment. Following Rhodesia's reconstitution and recognised independence as Zimbabwe in 1980, Wilson was awarded the Grand Cross of Valour.  He was the second and final person to be awarded the honour after Chris Schulenburg, who received the award while serving with the Selous Scouts.

During Rhodesia's transition to Zimbabwe, Wilson obtained the rank of major and retired after serving as Officer Commanding SAS from April 1980 to the unit's disbandment in December that year. He delivered the final regimental address at Kabrit Barracks on 13 December 1980, before the final lowering of the colours. An account of the role of the SAS in the Rhodesian Bush War was authored by Wilson and Greg Mills, entitled Who Dares Loses: Assessing Rhodesia's Counter-Insurgency Experience. Wilson was appointed as the President of the C-Squadron Rhodesian Special Air Service Association following the death of General Peter Walls.

Post-war
Residing in South Africa, Wilson is still actively involved in business and conservation initiatives where he consults to various organisations.

References

Rhodesian Special Air Service personnel
Living people
Year of birth missing (living people)
Zimbabwean emigrants to South Africa